This is a list of Australian mammal emblems.

See also
 List of Australian bird emblems
 List of Australian floral emblems

References

Zoology-related lists
Emblems
Australian Mammal